Cesare Gravina (23 January 1858 – 16 September 1954) was an Italian actor of the silent era who appeared in more than 70 films between 1911 and 1929.

Born in Naples, Gravina was an orchestra conductor in his native Italy. As the conductor at La Scala, among the noted vocalists he worked with were Mary Garden and Enrico Caruso. At some point he left music to become a character actor, sharing his reasons for the career change with no one. As the owner of many theaters in South America, Gravina was financially secure enough to retire from motion pictures by 1924, but he preferred to remain in acting.

Partial filmography

 The White Pearl (1915) - Setsu
 Madame Butterfly (1915) - The Soothsayer
 Poor Little Peppina (1916) - Villato
 Hulda from Holland (1916) - Apartment Neighbor (uncredited)
 Less Than the Dust (1916) - Jawan
 The Price She Paid (1917) - Moldini
 The Siren (1917) - Her Father
 The Fatal Ring (1917)
 Miss Nobody (1917) - 'Daddy' Crespi
 Let's Get a Divorce (1918) - Head Waiter
 The Mysterious Client (1918) - Ton Cavallo
 The Street of Seven Stars (1918) - Minor Role
 Marriage For Convenience (1919) - Lazzare
 Mothers of Men (1920) - Mr. Schultz - Gaston Glass
 Scratch My Back (1920) - Johoda
 The Penalty (1920) - Art Teacher (uncredited)
 Madame X (1920) - Victor
 From Now On (1920) - Tony Lomazzi
 The Leopard Woman (1920) - Arab (uncredited)
 Beach of Dreams (1921) - Prof. Epnard
 God's Country and the Law (1921) - 'Poleon
 Foolish Wives (1922) - Cesare Ventucci
 Daddy (1923) - Cesare Gallo
 Merry-Go-Round (1923) - Sylvester Urban
 Circus Days (1923) - Luigi, the Clown
 The Hunchback of Notre Dame (1923) - (uncredited)
 The Humming Bird (1924) - Charlot
 The Virgin (1924) - The Money Lender
 The Family Secret (1924) - Tomaso Silvano
 Butterfly (1924) - Von Mandescheid
 The Rose of Paris (1924) - George
 Those Who Dare (1924) - Panka
 Greed (1924) - Zwerkow - Junkman (uncredited)
 The Charmer (1925) - Señor Sprott
 Contraband (1925) - Pee Wee Bangs
 The Phantom of the Opera (1925) - Manager (uncredited)
 Fifth Avenue Models (1925) - Ludani's Tenement Neighbor
 An Enemy Of Men (1925) - Tony Caruso
 The Man in Blue (1925) - Tony Sartori
 Don Dare Devil (1925) - Esteban Salazar
 A Woman's Faith (1925) - Odillon Turcott
 The Circus Cyclone (1925) - Pepe
 Flower of Night (1925) - Servant
 Monte Carlo (1926) - Count Davigny
 The Midnight Sun (1926) - Opera Director
 The Blonde Saint (1926) - Ilario
 The Magic Garden (1927) - Maestro
 The Road to Romance (1927) - Castro
 Cheating Cheaters (1927) - Tony Verdi
 The Divine Woman (1928) - Gigi
 The Trail of '98 (1928) - Henry Kelland - Berna's Grandfather
 The Man Who Laughs (1928) - Ursus
 How to Handle Women (1928) - Tony
 The Wedding March (1928) - Martin Schrammell - Mitzi's father
 Burning the Wind (1929) - Don Ramón Valdez

References

External links

1858 births
1954 deaths
19th-century Neapolitan people
Italian male film actors
Italian male silent film actors
Italian emigrants to the United States
20th-century Italian male actors
Italian conductors (music)
Actors from New York City
Actors from Naples